Uralokannemeyeria is an extinct genus of kannemeyeriiform dicynodont known from the Middle Triassic Donguz Formation of Bashkortostan, Russia.

References

Anomodont genera
Kannemeyeriiformes
Prehistoric synapsids of Europe
Fossil taxa described in 1971